El Port de la Selva is a municipality in the comarca of the Alt Empordà in Catalonia, Spain, on the Costa Brava. It is situated on the northern coast of the Cap de Creus and is an important fishing port and tourist centre. The romanesque abbey of Sant Pere de Rodes is particularly notable.

Demography

References

 Panareda Clopés, Josep Maria; Rios Calvet, Jaume; Rabella Vives, Josep Maria (1989). Guia de Catalunya, Barcelona: Caixa de Catalunya.  (Spanish).  (Catalan).

External links 
Official website
 Government data pages 

Municipalities in Alt Empordà
Populated places in Alt Empordà